Cephaleuros parasiticus is a plant pathogenic member of the chlorophyta, or green algae. It infects several commercially important crops including tea. Unlike the majority of pathogenic Cephaleuros species it penetrates the epidermis of plants, and is not constrained to subcuticular growth. It has sometimes been misidentified as Cephaleuros virescens. Cortex penetration, and the naming as red rust of tea are marked differentiators of C. parasiticus from its relative C. virescens which does not penetrate the epidermis. It has been renamed several times as more phylogenetic information has become available.

Importance 
The disease is increasingly a concern in tea plantations throughout the Indian subcontinent and Sri Lanka in recent decades. It is also present in Chinese tea plantations, although apparently to a lesser extent. In some cases it can necessitate large scale replanting, which are especially vulnerable to C. parasiticus. It may present in up to one quarter of all tea plantations in Bangladesh, and is one of the major threats to the tea plantation industry. It has long been identified as a concern for the industry, with publications dating back to 1907. Already weakened plants, suffering from nutrient stress or damage caused by mechanical harvesters, are at heightened risk of severe infections. However, it is possible for otherwise healthy plants to develop an infection. The National Bank for Agriculture and Rural Development in India recommends the use of pesticides in the establishment of new tea plantations.

General biology

Symptoms and hosts 
Red rust is not exclusive to tea, and is known to infect other plants, including mango, coffee, citrus, and guava. It should not be confused with either the fungal coffee leaf rust, a basidiomycete rust; or with coffee red leaf spot, caused by the related C. virescens. Similar symptoms and pathogenesis seem to be present on all hosts.  The algae can penetrate the epidermis, although spores more readily spread through wounds.  It proceeds to invade the cortical tissue in the stem. In leaves, the rust causes chlorosis and variegation, which might be surrounded by anthocyanescence. One sign of an infection is red-orange filamentous growth emerging on wounds in humid conditions. The most extreme symptoms produce necrotic patches on the stem. Repeated infection cycles result in permanently reduced yields mortality, especially in younger plants.

Life cycle 
The algae has a latent period of roughly a year following the initial infection of damaged tissue. After this time, it will begin fruiting during rainy periods. It disperses as both motile zoospores, and also through wind-borne sporangium. Wind and rain are mechanisms of this dispersal.

Management 
The use of mechanical tea harvesters can increases the losses caused by this pathogen, as wounds on the plants allows for aggravated pathogenesis and eventual loss of the plant. As an algae, various agents including detergents and fungicides are mostly ineffective in controlling the disease. A mixture of urea and muriate of potash can also be applied via spraying. Tolerant cultivars are also being developed to reduce loss, although no resistant cultivars currently exist. Cultural practices such as eliminating weed shade and maintaining soil health have also been mentioned as important for the management of C. parasiticus. The mechanism of resistance from potash spraying is related to vigorous plant growth, as potash is an important nutrient for tea plants. The use of potash in conjunction with bordeaux spraying reduced the severity of the disease impact on crop yields. This is supported by findings that vigorous growth in young plants reduces the severity of an infection. Spraying with copper based fungicides up to three times throughout the summer, especially as the alga sporulates, will control the disease. Pruning infected branches can also help plants recover.

References

Trentepohliaceae
Tea diseases